The 2016 Red Bull Air Race of Abu Dhabi was the first round of the 2016 Red Bull Air Race World Championship season, the eleventh season of the Red Bull Air Race World Championship. The event was held in Abu Dhabi, the capital of the United Arab Emirates.

Master Class

Qualification

Round of 14

 Pilot received 2 seconds in penalties Pilot received 3 seconds in penalties

Round of 8

Final 4

Challenger Class

Results

Standings after the event

Master Class standings

Challenger Class standings

 Note: Only the top five positions are included for both sets of standings.

References

External links

|- style="text-align:center"
|width="35%"|Previous race:2015 Red Bull Air Race of Las Vegas
|width="30%"|Red Bull Air Race2016 season
|width="35%"|Next race:2016 Red Bull Air Race of Spielberg
|- style="text-align:center"
|width="35%"|Previous race:2015 Red Bull Air Race of Abu Dhabi
|width="30%"|Red Bull Air Race of Abu Dhabi
|width="35%"|Next race:2017 Red Bull Air Race of Abu Dhabi
|- style="text-align:center"

Abu Dhabi
Red Bull Air Race World Championship
Red Bull Air Race World Championship